Athletic Club Sparta Praha B, commonly known as Sparta Prague B or Sparta Prague u-21, is the reserve team of Czech First League club AC Sparta Prague and plays in the Czech National Football League in the second tier of the Czech football league system.

The team played in the Czech second level from 2002 to 2006, and from 2008 to 2012. Between 2014 and 2019 the team did not participate in the league structure, but made a return to the National Football League in 2021 after winning Group A of the Bohemian Football League in the COVID-shortened 2020–21 season.

Players

Reserve team squad
.

References

External links
Official website

AC Sparta Prague
Reserve team football
Youth football in the Czech Republic
Premier League International Cup